The Gouda–Den Haag railway is a heavily used railway line in the Netherlands, running from Gouda railway station to Den Haag Centraal railway station, passing through Zoetermeer railway station. It was opened in 1870.

Stations
The main interchange stations on the Gouda–Den Haag railway are:

Gouda: to Rotterdam and Leiden
Zoetermeer: to RandstadRail light rail network
Den Haag Centraal: to Rotterdam, Leiden and Amsterdam

Railway lines in the Netherlands
Railway lines opened in 1870
1870 establishments in the Netherlands
Railway lines in South Holland
Standard gauge railways in the Netherlands
Transport in The Hague
Gouda, South Holland
19th-century architecture in the Netherlands